Socialist Workers Party may refer to:

Flemish Socialist Workers Party
Estonian Socialist Workers' Party
German Socialist Workers Party in Poland - Left
Hungarian Socialist Workers' Party
Hungarian Socialist Workers' Party (1993)
Independent Socialist Workers Party, Czechoslovakia
Italian Socialist Workers' Party
Jewish Socialist Workers Party, Russian Empire
Luxembourg Socialist Workers' Party
National Socialist Workers Party (disambiguation)
Polish Socialist Workers Party
Revolutionary Socialist Workers' Party (France)
Revolutionary Socialist Workers' Party (Turkey)
Socialist Workers Party (Algeria)
Socialist Workers' Party (Argentina)
Socialist Workers Party (Australia)
Socialist Workers' Party (Belgium)
Socialist Workers' Party (Chile)
Socialist Workers Party (Croatia)
Socialist Workers Party (Cuba)
Socialist Workers Party (Denmark)
Socialist Workers Party (Finland)
Socialist Workers' Party (Greece)
Socialist Workers Party (India)
Socialist Workers Network Until 2018, the Irish Socialist Workers' Party was known as the SWP
Socialist Workers' Party (Mexico)
Socialist Workers' Party (Netherlands, 1959)
Socialist Workers Party (Palestine)
Socialist Workers Party (Peru), founded 1971, member of LIT-CI
Socialist Workers Party (United States)
Socialist Workers Party (UK)
Socialist Workers' Party of China
Socialist Workers' Party of Finland
Socialist Workers' Party of Germany
Socialist Workers Party of Hungary
Socialist Workers' Party of Sweden
Socialist Workers' Party of Yugoslavia (communists)
Spanish Socialist Workers' Party
United Jewish Socialist Workers Party, Russian Empire and Poland 
United Socialist Workers' Party, Brazil
Zionist Socialist Workers Party, Russian Empire and Poland

See also
Workers' Socialist Party (disambiguation)
Socialist Party (disambiguation)